Ajanta Pharma Limited, also known by the acronym APL, is a multinational company based in India engaged in development, manufacturing, and marketing of pharmaceutical formulations. It has a presence in India, the United States, and about 30 other countries in Africa, South East Asia, West Asia, and CIS. It was established in 1973.

Markets and business
Ajanta Pharma has over 1,400 products registered currently in various countries and an equal number of products are under approval.  In India, the company is a branded generic company focused on a few high growth specialty therapies in ophthalmology, dermatology, cardiology, and pain management.

Ajanta Pharma exports products to over 30 countries in Asia and Africa. In these markets, the company serves a wide range of therapeutic products in the areas of antimalarial, cardiovascular, gastrointestinal, antibiotic, dermatology, antihistamine, multivitamin, gynecology, and pain management.

Ajanta Pharma has recently stepped up its presence in the United States with a select product portfolio, which includes niche and complex technology products. Currently, the company has 27 products in the US market.

History 
In the early 2000s, Ajanta was noted as a major source of foreign currency, alongside Reddy Labs, arising from sales in Southeast Asia.  In particular, in 2003, a joint-venture between Ajanta and the Ministry of Health in Turkministan accounted for fully half of the pharmaceutical needs of the country.  The company had made several other joint-ventures with regional governments, such as Uzbekistan, Kazakhstan, Kyrygyzstan and Tajikistan, which it severed in the 2010s due to their being unprofitable.

The company experienced an enormous loss in 2005 in terms of diminution of the value of investments, amounting to four times the year's profits.  That same year, the company was noted as having the highest sales in India for any Indian pharmaceutical company, with sales of ₹13.56 billion.

In 2015, the company was highlighted as having had exceptional stock appreciation over the preceding four years, and the listing of the stock on the BSE 500 was noted.  By 2019, the stock was listed on the S&P BSE 200 index.

Manufacturing facilities
Ajanta Pharma operates seven manufacturing facilities in India. Six facilities manufacture finished formulations, including Dahej and Paithan plants which is approved by the US FDA and Guwahati plant which caters to domestic and emerging markets. Another plant manufactures active pharmaceutical ingredients (APIs) primarily for captive consumption.

Legal proceedings 
Bayer filed suit before the Delhi High Court accusing Ajanta of patent infringement on the erectile dysfunction treatments vardenafil and vardenafil hydrochloride.  Ajanta argued that Bayer was not using its patent in India for the benefit of India, which led the court to provide partial relief to an injunction granted to Bayer, allowing Ajanta to manufacture but not sell the product, in January 2017.  Bayer and Ajanta reached an unspecified agreement after mediation was ordered by the court in February 2017.

References

Notes

Patent applications in India 

 1998—Gazette of India, 31 October 1998, p. 1087 ;Gazette of India, 26 February 2000, p. 116
1999—Gazette of India, 18 September 1999, p. 843 ; Gazette of India, 4 March 2000, p. 123; Gazette of India, 20 October 2001, p. 1886
 2000—Gazette of India, 24 June 2000, p. 477; Gazette of India, 30 June 2001, p. 867; Gazette of India, 14 October 2001, p. 975; Gazette of India, 8 June 2002, p. 1178; Gazette of India, 6 September 2003, p. 4006
2001—Gazette of India, 29 March 2003, p. 1200
2002—Gazette of India, 15 February 2003, p. 518; Gazette of India, 20 March 2004, p. 1748; Gazette of India, 29 May 2004, p. 4014

Products subject to price control in India 

 Clinidipine+Metroprolol tablets—Gazette of India, Extraordinary, 21 December 2018, p. 8
Timolol+Brinzolamide eye drops—Gazette of India, Extraordinary, 2 November 2018, p. 21

External links
Ajanta Pharma, "One of the Giants of Tomorrow" - Fortune India’
Ajanta Pharma Ltd Listed in 'Forbes India - Super 50 Companies'
Ajanta Pharma Ltd |Company Profile

Pharmaceutical companies of India
Manufacturing companies based in Mumbai
Indian companies established in 1973
1973 establishments in Maharashtra
Pharmaceutical companies established in 1973
Companies listed on the National Stock Exchange of India
Companies listed on the Bombay Stock Exchange